Ileana Cotrubaș (born 9 June 1939) is a Romanian operatic soprano whose career spanned from the 1960s to the 1980s. She was much admired for her acting skills and facility for singing opera in many different languages.

Life and career

Cotrubaș was born in Galați. She grew up in a musical family; her father, Vasile, was a tenor in an amateur choir. Cotrubaș' musical career began at the age of nine when she became a member of a children's radio choir. By the age of eleven, she was one of its leading soloists. In 1952, she moved to Bucharest to study at the Școala Specială de Muzică school for the musically gifted. Cotrubaș made her stage debut with the Bucharest Opera as Yniold in Debussy's Pelléas et Mélisande in 1964. She subsequently expanded her repertory to include roles such as Oscar in Verdi's Un ballo in maschera, Gilda in Rigoletto, and Blonde in Mozart's The Abduction from the Seraglio and began appearing in productions throughout Europe.

In 1965, Cotrubaș won the International Vocal Competition 's-Hertogenbosch in Netherlands, where she won first prize in opera, lieder, and oratorio. The following year, she won the ARD International Music Competition in Munich. Those awards, together with her great success in the role of Pamina in Mozart's Die Zauberflöte at Brussels, led to appearances in the Vienna State Opera, Hamburg State Opera, Berlin State Opera and Salzburg Festival, and to a contract with the Oper Frankfurt in 1968.

In 1969, she made her UK debut at the Glyndebourne Festival as Mélisande, and sang two succeeding seasons there in the title role of Cavalli's Calisto. She made her début at the Royal Opera House in London in 1971 as Tatyana in Tchaikovsky's Eugene Onegin. Cotrubaș signed a three-year contract with the Vienna State Opera in 1970. During her time there, she learned the roles of Susanna in Mozart's Le nozze di Figaro, Zerlina in Don Giovanni, the title role in Verdi's La traviata, Mimi in Puccini's  La bohème, and Sophie in Der Rosenkavalier by Richard Strauss.

In 1973, she made her American operatic debut at the Lyric Opera of Chicago as Mimì, and at Glyndebourne sang Susanna opposite the Figaro of Knut Skram. Cotrubaș made her international breakthrough on 7 January 1975, when she replaced Mirella Freni at La Scala as Mimi. She had to fly from her home in Kent and arrived 15 minutes before curtain time. Her interpretation was acclaimed by critics and audiences alike.

Cotrubaș made her Metropolitan Opera debut on 23 March 1977, as Mimi in a production with José Carreras and Renata Scotto. While with the Met, she appeared as Gilda, opposite Plácido Domingo and Cornell MacNeil, in a televised performance of Rigoletto on 7 November 1977, and as Violetta, again opposite Domingo and MacNeil, in a televised performance of La traviata on 28 March 1981. She sang three other roles at the Met: Ilia in Mozart's Idomeneo (in its Metropolitan Opera premiere), Tatyana, and Micaëla in Bizet's Carmen, the role of her final performance with the company on 26 March 1987.

Cotrubaș is known for being very demanding of directors and colleagues. On several occasions — Eugene Onegin in Vienna in 1973 and Don Pasquale at the Met in 1980 — she walked out of productions when she disagreed with the stage director. She retired from public singing in 1990, but continued to teach, giving master classes and coaching promising young singers, including Elena Tsallagova.

Recordings
Puccini : La Bohème Ileana Cotrubaș with Luciano Pavarotti and Piero Cappuccilli, conducted by Carlos Kleiber, live recording at La Scala, Milan 22 March 1979 EX92T01/2 CD
Verdi: Rigoletto Ileana Cotrubaș with Plácido Domingo and Piero Cappuccilli, Vienna Philharmonic Orchestra, conducted by Carlo Maria Giulini, studio recording under the Deutsche Grammophon label. Cat: STEREO 4152888-2.
Verdi: Rigoletto Ileana Cotrubaș with Plácido Domingo and Cornell MacNeil, Metropolitan Opera, conducted by James Levine, DVD under Deutsche Grammophon label.
Verdi: La Traviata Ileana Cotrubaș with Plácido Domingo and Sherrill Milnes, conducted by Carlos Kleiber, studio recording under the Deutsche Grammophon label.
Bizet: Les Pêcheurs de Perles  Ileana Cotrubaș (Leila), Alain Vanzo (Nadir), Guillermo Sarabia (Zurga), Roger Soyer (Nourabad), Paris Opera Orchestra and chorus, Georges Prêtre, conductor. Audio CD: EMI Cat: 367702-2
Donizetti: L'Elisir d'Amore  Ileana Cotrubas with Plácido Domingo, Geraint Evans and Ingvar Wixell and Lillian Watson and Royal Opera House Orchestra, John Pritchard, conductor under CBS label
Charpentier: Louise  Ileana Cotrubas with Plácido Domingo, Gabriel Bacquier and Jane Berbié, New Philharmonia Orchestra and Ambrosian Opera Chorus, Georges Prêtre, conductor under Sony Masterworks label
Massenet: Manon  Ileana Cotrubas with Alfredo Kraus, Choeurs et Orchestre du Capitole de Toulouse, Michel Plasson, conductor under EMI label
Francesco Cavalli: La Calisto  Ileana Cotrubas with Janet Baker, London Philharmonic Orchestra, Raymond Leppard, conductor under Decca label
Puccini: Il Trittico  Ileana Cotrubas with Renata Scotto, New Philharmonia Orchestra, Lorin Maazel, conductor under Sony label
Bizet: Carmen  Ileana Cotrubas with Teresa Berganza, London Symphony Orchestra, Claudio Abbado, conductor under DG label
Humperdinck: Hänsel und Gretel  Ileana Cotrubas with Frederica von Stade, and Christa Ludwig, Gürzenich Orchestra, John Pritchard, conductor under Sony label
Handel: Rinaldo  Ileana Cotrubas, La Grande Ecurie et la Chambre du Roya, Jean-Claude Malgoire, conductor under Sony label
Rossini: Il Turco in Italia Ileana Cotrubas, with James Morris, Vienna Philharmonic, Leonard Bernstein, conductor under DG label
Mozart: Le Nozze di Figaro  Ileana Cotrubas, Vienna Philharmonic, Herbert von Karajan, conductor under Decca label
Mozart: Die Zauberflöte  Ileana Cotrubas, Vienna Philharmonic Orchestra, James Levine, conductor under RCA label
Mozart: Così Fan Tutte  Ileana Cotrubas, Royal Opera House Covent Garden, Colin Davis, conductor under Phillips label
Mozart: Idomeneo  Ileana Cotrubas with Luciano Pavarotti, and Hildegard Behrens, James Levine, conductor under DG label
Mozart: Bastien Und Bastienne  Ileana Cotrubas, Leopold Hager, conductor under Orfeo label
Mozart: Requiem  Ileana Cotrubas, Neville Marriner, conductor

See also
Haydn: La fedeltà premiata (Antal Doráti recording) (CD)
Humperdinck: Hänsel und Gretel (John Pritchard recording) (CD)
Mozart: Le nozze di Figaro (Herbert von Karajan recording) (CD)
Mozart: Idomeneo (Jean-Pierre Ponnelle film) (DVD)
The Metropolitan Opera Centennial Gala (DVD)
James Levine's 25th Anniversary Metropolitan Opera Gala (DVD)

References

External links

 Discography at SonyBMG Masterworks
 Interview with Ileana Cotrubas, 7 January 1986

1939 births
Living people
People from Galați
Grand Officers of the Order of the Star of Romania
Romanian operatic sopranos
20th-century Romanian women opera singers
Österreichischer Kammersänger
National University of Music Bucharest alumni
Prize-winners of the ARD International Music Competition